Jatun Ch'utu (Quechua jatun big, ch'utu cone, "big cone", also spelled Jatun Chutu) is a mountain in the Bolivian Andes which reaches a height of approximately . It is located in the Potosí Department, Tomás Frías Province, Potosí Municipality. It lies southeast of the village of Juch'uy Wasi (Juchuy Huasi). The Jatun Mayu flows along its southern slopes.

References 

Mountains of Potosí Department